XHPNA-FM is a radio station on 101.9 FM in Tepic, Nayarit, Mexico. The station is owned by Grupo Radiorama and carries its Romántica romantic music format.

History

XEPNA-AM 1590 received its concession on November 30, 1994. It was owned by Grupo Radiorama from the start but soon moved to 890 kHz.

References

Radio stations in Nayarit